The Peru marsupial frog (Gastrotheca peruana) is a species of frog in the family Hemiphractidae that is endemic to Peru. Its natural habitats are subtropical and tropical high-altitude grasslands, rivers, freshwater marshes, intermittent freshwater marshes, arable land, pastureland, rural gardens, and urban areas.
This frog is kept as a pet, and has been recorded in the pet trade in Germany, although without significant threat to the species.

References

External links
Comparative Toxicogenomics Database: Gastrotheca peruana

Gastrotheca
Amphibians of Peru
Amphibians of the Andes
Endemic fauna of Peru
Frogs of South America
Taxonomy articles created by Polbot
Amphibians described in 1900